Navigator is an album released in 2001 by New Zealand hip-hop artist, Che Fu.

Track listing

Source: Spotify.

Chart performance

Reception

Kelvin Hayes of AllMusic said the variation of genres in Navigator resulted in Che Fu's voice being compared to "a narrative too seldom heard".

Certifications

References

Che Fu albums
2001 albums